Arthur William Brandt (March 14, 1888 – June 11, 1943) was the New York State Superintendent of Public Works from March 30, 1939, to May 20, 1943.

Biography
He was born in Ontario, New York, on March 14, 1888, during the Great Blizzard of 1888. He was the New York State Superintendent of Public Works from March 30, 1939, to May 20, 1943. He died on June 11, 1943, at Doctors Hospital.

References

New York State Superintendents of Public Works
1888 births
1943 deaths
People from Ontario, New York
20th-century American politicians